Patrick Ottoz (born 15 June 1971) is an Italian former athlete who competed in the 400 metres hurdles.

Biography
His personal, set in Bologna on 26 May 1996, is the seventh Italian all-time best performance. He is the son of the Italian Olympic legend Eddy Ottoz (bronze medal at the 1968 Summer Olympics).

Achievements

Progression
400 m hs

See also
 Italian all-time lists - 400 metres hurdles
 Ottoz family

References

External links
 

1971 births
Italian male hurdlers
Living people
Sportspeople from Brescia
Italian masters athletes
World Athletics Championships athletes for Italy